The Type Allocation Code (TAC) is the initial eight-digit portion of the 15-digit IMEI and 16-digit IMEISV codes used to uniquely identify wireless devices.

The Type Allocation Code identifies a particular model (and often revision) of wireless telephone for use on a GSM, UMTS or other IMEI-employing wireless network.

The first two digits of the TAC are the Reporting Body Identifier.  This indicates the GSMA-approved group that allocated the TAC.

Prior to January 1, 2003, the global standard for the IMEI started with a six-digit Type Approval Code followed by a two-digit Final Assembly Code (FAC).
The Type Approval Code (also known as TAC) indicated that the particular device was approved by a national GSM approval body and the FAC identified the company that had built and assembled the device (which is not always the same as the brand name stamped on the device).

Effective on that date, many GSM member nations and entities (mainly Europe) moved away from requiring that devices be approved by national bodies, and towards a system where device manufacturers self-regulate the device market. As a result, a manufacturer now simply requests an eight-digit Type Allocation Code for a new phone model from the international GSM standards body, instead of submitting a device for approval to a national review body.

Both the old and new TAC uniquely identify a model of phone, although some models may have more than one code, depending on revision, manufacturing location, and other factors.

TAC examples

New Zealand RBI broadband service TAC lock 

In New Zealand with the rollout of the government subizidised rural broadband innovative a way was required to prevent users inserting the rural broadband SIM cards in an unauthorised devices to get subsidized data rates.

The use of a TAC lock was devised by the use of a customised SIM card with imbedded TAC codes was devised, Several Type allocation codes can be stored in the Sim cards of the device to allow a group of provider supplied huawei branded 4G modems and block the use of unauthorised and third party devices on the network.

A company wishing to resell vodafone RBI is required to supply a device for approval process and certification and supply vodafone with the TAC details of this device to embed into the SIM cards at the point of manufacture, a minimum order of 500 SIM cards is required.

There has been controversy around this decision as Huawei is the sole provider of the rural 4g broad band devices and a bulletin was released by the NZ GSSB to block the 5g rollout with Huawei hardware but users are forced to use Huawei devices on the 4G RBI network, security concerns have been raised, as the devices are capable of over the air updates.

See also 
IMSI

External links
3GPP Change Request re Type Allocation Code
 Check Detailed information about the IMEI Number

GSM standard